Hirtodrosophila duncani is a North American fruit fly, a member of the fungus-breeding genus Hirtodrosophila. Its taxonomic position has been unclear for a long time due to its unique male genitalia, but recent molecular studies indicate that it is closely related to the New World Sophophora.

References

Drosophilidae
Diptera of North America
Insects described in 1918